Cinysca is a genus of sea snails, marine gastropod mollusks in the family Areneidae.

Species
Species within the genus Cinysca include:
 Cinysca alvesi Rubio & Rolan, 2002
 Cinysca arlequin Rubio & Rolan, 2002
 Cinysca bicarinata (Martens, 1902)
 Cinysca dunkeri (Philippi, 1852)
 Cinysca forticostata (E. A. Smith, 1904)
 Cinysca granulata (A. Adams, 1853)
 Cinysca jullieni Adam & Knudsen, 1969
 Cinysca semiclausa (Thiele, 1925)
 Cinysca spuria (Gould, 1861)
Species brought into synonymy
 Cinysca granulosa (Krauss, 1848): synonym of Cinysca dunkeri (Philippi, 1853)

References

 Kilburn R.N. (1970) Taxonomic notes on South African marine Mollusca, I. Annals of the Cape Provincial Museums 8(4): 39-48
 Gofas, S.; Afonso, J.P.; Brandào, M. (Ed.). (S.a.). Conchas e Moluscos de Angola = Coquillages et Mollusques d'Angola. [Shells and molluscs of Angola]. Universidade Agostinho / Elf Aquitaine Angola: Angola. 140 pp
  Branch, G.M. et al. (2002). Two Oceans. 5th impression. David Philip, Cate Town & Johannesburg
 Millard, V. (2003). Classification of Mollusca: a classification of world wide Mollusca, volume 1. Gastropoda. 3rd Edition. Victor Millard: South Africa. . 1-890 pp
 Williams S.T., Karube S. & Ozawa T. (2008) Molecular systematics of Vetigastropoda: Trochidae, Turbinidae and Trochoidea redefined. Zoologica Scripta 37: 483–506

External links

Areneidae